Golam Dastagir Gazi (born 14 August 1948) is a Bangladeshi industrialist and a politician of Bangladesh Awami League party. He is the incumbent Jatiya Sangsad member representing the Narayanganj-1 constituency. In January 2019, he was selected as the Minister of Textiles and Jute.

Gazi is the chairman of Gazi TV and the Chairman of Gazi Group. He is a former director of Bangladesh Cricket Board.

Gazi is a recipient of Bir Protik, the fourth highest gallantry award in Bangladesh. In liberation war he was the member of the guerilla group  Crack Platoon. In 2020, he was awarded Independence Day Award by the Government of Bangladesh.

Early life and education 
Gazi was born to Golam Kibria Gazi and Shamsunnesa Begum. Gazi graduated from the University of Dhaka in 1968.

Career 
In 1977, Gazi was elected as a commissioner in the first election of the Dhaka City Corporation from his electoral areas — Kakrail, Sidheshwari, Malibag, Eskaton and Mogbazar. Gazi started his manufacturing industries in plastic and rubber sector in 1974.

Gazi is a former president of Bangladesh-China Chamber of Commerce and Industry.

Personal life
Gazi is married to Hasina Gazi (b. 1955), a former mayor of Tarabo Municipality, Narayanganj. The couple is blessed with 2 sons.

Awards
 Bir Protik
 Independence Day Award (2020)

References

Living people
1948 births
People from Narayanganj District
Awami League politicians
Recipients of the Bir Protik
9th Jatiya Sangsad members
10th Jatiya Sangsad members
11th Jatiya Sangsad members
Textiles and Jute ministers of Bangladesh
Recipients of the Independence Day Award
Notre Dame College, Dhaka alumni
Mukti Bahini personnel